Verkhny Allaguvat (Ürge Allağıwat) is a rural locality (a village) in Allaguvatsky Selsoviet, Sterlibashevsky District, Bashkortostan, Russia. The population was 154 as of 2010. There are 3 streets.

Geography 
Verkhny Allaguvat is located 38 km southeast of Sterlibashevo (the district's administrative centre) by road. Nizhny Allaguvat is the nearest rural locality.

References 

Rural localities in Sterlibashevsky District